Ángel de Andrés López (23 October 1951 – 4 May 2016) was a Spanish actor. He appeared in more than 60 films and television shows between 1977 and 2015. He died at his home in Miraflores de la Sierra from natural causes.

Selected filmography

References

External links

1951 births
2016 deaths
Spanish male film actors
Male actors from Madrid
20th-century Spanish male actors
21st-century Spanish male actors